Domagoj Bulat (born 17 January 1996) is a Croatian water polo player. He is currently playing for VK Solaris. He is 6 ft 2 in (1.88 m) tall and weighs 216 lb (98 kg).

References

1996 births
Living people
Croatian male water polo players
Sportspeople from Šibenik